Lameh, also rendered as Lyuma and Lumeh, may refer to:
 Lameh Dasht, Ardabil Province
 Lameh Eslam, East Azerbaijan Province
 Lameh-ye Arameneh, East Azerbaijan Province